János Tóth (16 July 1864 – 23 December 1929) was a Hungarian politician, who served as Interior Minister in 1918.

References
 Magyar Életrajzi Lexikon

1864 births
1929 deaths
People from Túrkeve
Hungarian Interior Ministers